The R320 road is a regional road in east County Mayo in Ireland. It connects Swinford to Claremorris via Kiltimagh, and links the N5 and N26 roads near Swinford with the N60 and N17 roads near Claremorris. The R320 connects with six other regional roads along its route.

The government legislation that defines the R320, the Roads Act 1993 (Classification of Regional Roads) Order 2012 (Statutory Instrument 54 of 2012), provides the following official description:

R320: Swinford — Claremorris, County Mayo

Between its junction with N26 at Main Street Swinford and its junction with N60 at Lugatemple via Market Street and Chapel Street at Swinford; Newpark, Carrowcanada, Kinaff, Shanvally; Aiden Street, Main Street and Chapel Street at Kiltimagh; Gortgarve, Carrowreagh, Murneen and Kilcolman all in the county of Mayo

and

between its junction with N60 at Inner Relief Road and its junction with R331 at Main Street via Mount Street all in the town of Claremorris in the county of Mayo

and

between its junction with R331 at James Street in the town of Claremorris and its junction with N17 at Lisduff via Clare all in the county of Mayo.

See also
List of roads of County Mayo
National primary road
National secondary road
Regional road
Roads in Ireland

References

Regional roads in the Republic of Ireland
Roads in County Mayo